is a Japanese footballer who plays for SC Sagamihara.

Club statistics
Updated to 23 February 2016.

References

External links

Profile at SC Sagamihara

1987 births
Living people
Nippon Sport Science University alumni
Association football people from Kanagawa Prefecture
Japanese footballers
J3 League players
Japan Football League players
YSCC Yokohama players
AC Nagano Parceiro players
FC Ryukyu players
SC Sagamihara players
Association football defenders